Tom Christopher (born 1952) is an American painter known for his expressionist urban paintings and murals, mostly of New York City. Christopher began as a commercial artist, and has become a painter with worldwide galleries and exhibitions.

Life and art

Early life and work
Christopher was born in Hollywood, California. He initially studied at the Pasadena Museum of California Art in 1974. He then went Art Center College of Design in Pasadena to receive his Bachelor in Fine Arts in 1979 where he studied with the noted California artists Lorser Feitelson and Ward Kimball. He supported himself during school by doing drawings at Disney in Anaheim. Christopher grew up "in the LA hot rod / skateboard culture" which influenced his art.
Christopher started his art career with commercial art in California. His first work was for CBS Records. He received a gold record for his work on promotional posters. He also worked for Motor Trend magazine. In 1981 he moved to New York City, and worked for the New York Times, People, Fortune and Wall Street Journal, as well as a courtroom artist for CBS news, covering trials as diverse as John Lennon's shooter and "The Diet Doc Killer" Jean Harris.

Transition to fine art
Christopher began creating fine art in the mid 80's with "...painting household objects and tools on a Brobdingnagian scale" in addition to making cast-iron sculptures, which were featured "...in galleries in the East Village". These works were most notably featured in Socrates Sculpture Park, Oil and Steel Gallery (L.I.C. NY 1992) and the "Tools as Art: The Hechinger Collection" at National Building Museum Washington D.C. (1990s).

Transition to current style
The early 1990s also marked the start of Tom Christopher's signature NYC paintings. The first gallery to feature this was the Saint Marks Gallery in 1990. After receiving more success and reception with this style, he slowly switched to primarily this style in the 90's, and "Now his subject matter is largely focused on the streets of New York."

Projects

Virtual reality fine art installations 
Partnering with the Fashion Institute of Technology's Department of Fine Art Media Laboratory, Tom Christopher and students from FIT will create three Bronx-specific VR experiences for the Montefiore Medical Center. Patients will experience the environment seeking to diminish anxiety, pain and opioid addiction through stimulus-rich, curated artistic environments. The FIT Exhibition: The Future Is Immersive has featured some of Tom Christopher's work.

The first of three projects is a virtual city block, made up of elements from different streets to create a "virtual" city block typical of the South Bronx. Christopher and students sketched on site and took photographs which were used to make preliminary drawings before translating via Tilt Brush into a virtual 3D canvas. "The process allows you to blow it up to the size of a billboard, or shrink it to the size of an ant. Walk through or around or hover from above.

Paseo Caribe Mural Project 

In 2016 Tom Christopher collaborated with art students from Escuela de Artes Plásticas y Diseño to create a  public space mural. Originally in the El Mercado public square, these murals have been transferred to the Luis Munoz International Airport, San Juan.  

Christopher recently did a black and white series of paintings in a "New York is Noir Again" collection. He currently works out of his studio, Lift Trucks Project in North Salem, New York. Most paintings seem to go overseas to international art fairs and Galerie Barbara von Stechow in Frankfurt, and Galerie Tamenaga in Paris, Osaka and Tokyo.

Christopher has also recently been experimenting with collage-style paintings and silkscreens that utilize multiple images and layers with Master Printer Gary Lichtenstein. They had a show together at Aldrich Contemporary Art Museum, Ridgefield, Connecticut entitled "35 Years of Screenprinting".

Lift Trucks Project
In 2010 Christopher founded Lift Trucks Project in Croton Falls, New York. It is an alternative art space with exhibitions featuring works from FA-Q, Christo, Ottmar Hoerl, Ed Roth ("Big Daddy"), A. R. Penck, Sailor Jerry, and others.

Brill Building
In the summer of 2014, Tom Christopher and Oscar Andy Hammerstein took a studio residence in the Brill Building windows during its renovations. The art project was conducted as an installation and an inside look into the artistic process. The subject matter was Times Square and the streets of New York City.

Classifications
Christopher is known for his New York City urban paintings. Most of the work is painted using small-batch, handmade acrylic paint. Pencil lines from the initial exploratory sketch stage often remain on the white canvass. His typical images include cabbies, delivery men, skylines, and chaotic New York City scenes. His work is usually done with acrylic paint in an expressionist style.

Critical reception
Christopher is most notable in the New York City art scene, with mostly positive reviews from sources such as The New York Times. One article features a quote by former NYC Mayor Rudolph Giuliani, who stated "Tom has an uncanny talent for capturing the essence of New York City from the perspective of those who have enjoyed the sights of the city on foot."

He has also received acclaim through his museum exhibitions: he was included in the 1999 "New, New York Views" exhibition at Museum of the City of New York, and recently had a "Metropolis" exhibition at Butler Institute of American Art. The Butler Institute of American Art Director and Chief Curator Dr. Louis A. Zona stated that Christopher "...has bridged the gap between pure narrative painting and expressionist abstraction. He has become to American painting what Count Basie or Duke Ellington became to American popular music, not completely jazz but certainly owing much to Charlie Parker and Charlie Mingus."

Applied projects

Tom Christopher  and watchmaker Ikepod have collaborated on new models featuring Christopher's work on the watch face.  A  clothing line by Illusions was introduced in 2020.  In 2019 Christopher's studio and flash art collection was featured on American Pickers. Christopher has done work on a line of clothing with Urban Outfitters and Nordstroms entitled "Threads4Thought". He also was commissioned by Michel Roux for the "Absolut Collection" for Absolut Vodka and was included in the "Absolut Book" by Richard Lewis. Christopher has also designed a "Cruzer" line of snowboards for Burton Snowboards. In addition, he was commissioned to paint an oversized baseball for the New York Yankees for their 2000 game against the Atlanta Braves. Ikepod Watch has started a Tom Christopher Art Series to go along with past collaborations with artists Jeff Koons and pop arts KAWS.

Exhibitions

Selected solo exhibitions

St. Marks Gallery New York 1990 
Eastmann Wahmendorf Gallery, Helio Gallery, New York 1990
Tamenaga Gallery, New York: 1993, 1994 
Michael Owen Gallery, New York: 1996 
David Findlay Galleries, New York: 1997, 1998, 2000, 2002, 2005
Galerie Tamenaga, Tokyo, Osaka: 1997, 1999, 2002, 2004, 2007,2010
Galerie Tamenaga, Paris: 1999, 2001, 2004, 2006, 2009,2011,2013,2014,2015, 2016 
Galerie Barbara von Stechow, Frankfurt: 1999, 2002, 2004,2007,2009,2012,2013,2014,2015, 2016 
Galerie Vomel, Düsseldorf: 2004, 2006, 2010
Van Brunt Gallery, Beacon, NY: 2007 
Conde Nast Building, NYC Per Cent for Art Commission, 2007
The Butler Institute of American Art, Youngstown Ohio: May 2008 
HSBC, Trinkaus and Burkhardt, Frankfurt: 2007, Hamburg: 2008 
J.N. Bartfield Gallery New York: 2008, 2015, 2016 
 Brill Building Project, New York, NY, 2014
The Future is Immersive Fashion Institute of Technology, New York, NY 2019
The New Yorkers, a solo exhibition in Frankfurt Germany by Galerie Barbara von Stechow, 2019
Life Before A Pandemic, an exhibition at Laverdin Gallery,  445 Park Avenue, NYC, 2020
Tom Christopher, a solo exhibition in Frankfurt Germany by Galerie Barbara von Stechow, 2021
Tom Christopher, a one-man exhibition at  Galerie Tamenaga, 2022
Selected group exhibitions

The Clocktower Center for Art & Urban Resources, New York: 1980
East Village Artists, Tokyo], Japan: 1985
"Tools" San Francisco Arts Commission Gallery, San Francisco: 1988
Socrates Sculpture Park, Oil and Steel Gallery L.I.C. NY 1992
"Kustom Kulture" The Works Gallery, Los Angeles: 1993
"Cityscapes" The Roger Smith Gallery, New York: 1993 
"Modern Times" Katonah Museum of Art, Katonah: 1993
"New, New York Views" Museum of the City of New York City: 1999
Art Cologne, Germany, 2000 
"Art for America" Benefit: Twin Towers Fund, New York: 2002
"City Rhythms" Pelham Art Center, Pelham, NY: 2002
"Kunstakademie, Kunsthalle Trier, Germany": 2002
"Hessische Landesvertretung" Berlin: 2004
"New Views: Modern NY Cityscapes" The New York Historical Society Museum: 2004 
"At the Crossroads of Desire" The AXA Gallery, New York: 2004
FIAC, Paris 2005 
"PRINT- Andy Warhol, Ken Price, Tom Christopher" – Ward Pound Ridge, New York 2006 
Galerie Mada Primavesi, Madrid: 2007
 35 years of Printmaking, Aldrich Contemporary Art Museum, CT 2010 
 Greg Hubert Gallery, New York, NY, 2012
 Art Brussels, 2014 
 Carrousel du Louvre, Paris, France 2015
 Art Karlsruhe, 2015
 Art Kunst Zurich, 2015
 Art Miami, 2016
 Art New York, 2016
 Art Karlsruhe, 2016
 Avenue of the Americans, 2016
 Contemporary Art Fair Zurich, 2017
 Art Miami, 2017
 Art Karlsruhe, 2018
 Art Fair Tokyo, 2018
 Art New York, 2018
 Art Zurich, 2018
 Art Miami, 2108
 Brussels Art Fair, 2019
 Paper Positions Art Fair, Munich, Frankfurt and Berlin, 2019
 Karlsruhe Art Fair, 2020
 Dreaming Together: New-York Historical Society and Asia Society Museum, 2020-2021
Big City Symphony, Tom Christopher, Detlef Waschkau and Thomas Kellner, New Art Association Aschaffenburg eV 2021
Salon Du Dessin, 2022
Paris Gallery Weekend 2022
Art Karlsruhe 2022
Kunst Zürich 2022

Selected public installations

2016 – Paseo Caribe Mural Project, San Juan, Puerto Rico
1992 – Socrates Sculpture Park, Long Island City, New York
1997 – Roseland Mural, 30' x 230', West 53rd Street, New York (Now demolished)
1998 – MTA, "Art in Transit" Subway Art Series, New York
2004 – The New York Historical Society Museum, installation of chair, easel, and painting
2006, 2007 – Times Square Project, Times Square, New York
2012 – NYU Langone Medical Center, Mural, "I Like New York Because Everything Interesting Can Be Found There," 10' x 30' New York City
"HammerBrush" bronze, dm various
"Mason's Trowel" automotive enamel, 20' x 65’
"Floating I Beam" automotive enamel,130'x 35'

References

External links 

 http://www.ltproject.com/ltproject/Lobby_1.html

20th-century American painters
American male painters
21st-century American painters
1952 births
Living people
Painters from California
People from Hollywood, Los Angeles
People from North Salem, New York
20th-century American male artists